Dmitri Sergeyevich Zakharov (born 9 April 2000) is a Russian football player. He plays for FC Kuban-Holding Pavlovskaya.

Club career
He made his debut in the Russian Football National League for FC Baltika Kaliningrad on 20 October 2018 in a game against FC Krasnodar-2 as a 76th-minute substitute for Vladislav Kryuchkov. He made his first start on 10 November in a game against FC Tom Tomsk.

References

External links
 
 Profile by Russian Football National League

2000 births
Sportspeople from Kaliningrad
Living people
Russian footballers
Association football midfielders
FC Baltika Kaliningrad players
FC Dynamo Bryansk players
FC Znamya Truda Orekhovo-Zuyevo players